|}

The Aston Park Stakes is a Group 3 flat horse race in Great Britain open to horses aged four years or older.
It is run at Newbury over a distance of 1 mile and 4 furlongs. Up until 2014 it was run over a distance of 1 mile 5 furlongs and 61 yards (2,671 metres), and it is scheduled to take place each year in May. The race was upgraded to Group 3 level from the 2016 running, having previously been a run as a Listed race. Since the 2016 running the race has been sponsored by Al Rayyan and run as the Al Rayyan Stakes.

Winners since 1988

See also 
Horse racing in Great Britain
List of British flat horse races

References

 Paris-Turf:
Racing Post:

 horseracingintfed.com – International Federation of Horseracing Authorities – Aston Park Stakes (2018).

Flat races in Great Britain
Newbury Racecourse
Open middle distance horse races